Valentina Tauceri (born 20 July 1966 in Trieste) is a former female middle- and long-distance runner from Italy.

Biography
She is best known for winning the gold medal in the women's 3000 metres at the 1993 Mediterranean Games in Narbonne, France. Tauceri set her personal best (15:31.19) in the 5000 m on 13 June 1993 in Arzignano. She has 24 caps in national team from 1985 to 1999.

Achievements

National titles
Valentina Tauceri has won 4 times the individual national championship.
1 win in the 3000 metres (1993)
5 wins in the 1500 metres indoor (1987, 1988)
1 win in the cross country running (1997)

References

External links
 

1966 births
Living people
Sportspeople from Trieste
Italian female middle-distance runners
Italian female long-distance runners
World Athletics Championships athletes for Italy
Mediterranean Games gold medalists for Italy
Athletes (track and field) at the 1993 Mediterranean Games
Mediterranean Games medalists in athletics
Italian female cross country runners